The Bhim class of tugboats is a class of service watercraft built by Tebma Shipyard Limited, a subsidiary of Bharati Shipyard Ltd, for the Indian navy.

Description
Each vessel is 28.5 metres long and has a beam of 9.5 metres and a draught of 2.8 metres. Each tug in the class has a capacity of 25 tonnes bollard pull. The vessel are fitted with a pair of V-12 cylinder Cummins KTA38M2 engines, each generating 1200 HP continuous duty at 1800 RPM. They are fitted with stainless steel propellers and also features Aquamaster US1201 Z-drives with 1800mm diameter nozzles. They also have two 100 kVA, 415 V, 3 Phase, 50 Hz diesel powered auxiliary generator sets. It is a follow-up order of B.C. Dutt class tugboat

Service history
SRPBhim and SRP Ajral serve with the Eastern Naval Command at Vishakhapatnam, and SRP Balshil serves with the Southern Naval Command at Kochi.

Boats in the class

Other specifications
Auxiliary power installed: 100 kW, 415 V, 3 Phase, 50 Hz diesel
Fuel carrying capacity : 25 tons
Water carrying capacity : 12 tons

See also
Tugboats of the Indian Navy

References 
Sainik Samachar - Balshil joins Navy - Retrieved on 2009-04-27.
Bhim class at Bharat-Rakshak - Retrieved on 2009-05-05.
Bhim class
First Bhim class tug delivered

External links
Tebma official website 

 
Auxiliary ships of the Indian Navy
Tugs of the Indian Navy
 
Auxiliary tugboat classes